The Umbrella Group is a negotiation group consisting of 12 parties to the UNFCCC. The Umbrella Group later became known as the JUSCANZ.

Members

CIS & Annex I

Annex I&II

Independent

References

 

United Nations Framework Convention on Climate Change